The Sumathi Popular Teledrama Actor Award is presented annually in Sri Lanka by the Sumathi Group of Companies for the most Popular Sri Lankan television actor of the year, determined by a publicly popular vote.

The annual award was first given in 1995. The following is a list of the winners of this award since then.

References

Popular Actor
Television acting awards